Stephen Jones (born 14 April 1955) is a South African cricketer. He played in 81 first-class and 35 List A matches for Boland and Western Province from 1974/75 to 1987/88.

References

External links
 

1955 births
Living people
South African cricketers
Boland cricketers
Western Province cricketers
Cricketers from Cape Town